Kilbourne Hole is a maar volcanic crater, located  west of the Franklin Mountains of El Paso, Texas, in the Potrillo volcanic field of Doña Ana County, New Mexico.  Another maar, Hunt's Hole, lies just two miles south of Kilbourne Hole. Kilbourne Hole is notable for the large number of mantle xenoliths, solid fragments of mantle rock, that were carried to the surface by the eruption.

Estimates of the age of the crater vary from about 24,000 to about 80,000 years.

In 1975, Kilbourne Hole was designated as a National Natural Landmark by the National Park Service. It is now part of Organ Mountains–Desert Peaks National Monument.

Geologic setting and formation
Kilbourne Hole and Hunt's Hole are found in the central part of the Potrillo volcanic field, which also contains the Afton-Aden basalt flows. The area is part of the Rio Grande rift, where the Earth's crust is being stretched and thinned. The rift is characterized by deep sedimentary basins, recent faulting and volcanic activity, and unusually high heat flow upwards from the Earth's mantle. Kilbourne Hole and Hunt's Hole are located on the same north-trending fault of the Fitzgerald-Robledo fault system.

A maar forms when rising magma encounters sediment beds saturated with groundwater. The magma heats the groundwater to the point where the vapor pressure overcomes the weight of the overlying beds (the overburden pressure) and the beds are catastrophically blown out. Country rock is fragmented and expelled into the atmosphere together with fragments of the magma, creating a deep crater, the bottom of which sits below the pre-eruptive ground surface.

Kilbourne Hole erupted through alluvium (unconsolidated water-deposited sediments) and through a thin basalt flow. Like most maars, it has a shallow rim, composed of erupted material that was deposited as thin pyroclastic surge deposits.

Description of the crater

 

The basalt cliffs resemble the cliffs of the Devils Postpile National Monument near Yosemite National Park, with the characteristic reddish purple hexagonal columns, except that they are not as tall. The base of the cliffs is covered with a scree of basalt blocks. The basalt thins and disappears on the southwestern rim of the hole.

The eastern and northern rim of the hole have low rim deposits of ejecta from the maar eruptions. These rest on the basalt flow where it is present or on older sediments. The ejecta at Kilbourne Hole contains dropstones and a large number of xenoliths derived from the lower crust and mantle. These have been closely studied by geologists to learn more about geologic processes deep underground.

Hunt's Hole is a little smaller, with basalt cliffs only at the northeast and southeast sides of the crater. A dry lakebed lies on the floor of each crater.

Xenoliths
Kilbourne Hole is notable for the abundance of xenoliths in the crater ejecta. These are fragments of country rock carried intact to the surface by the eruption. Xenoliths at Kilbourne Hole include both upper mantle rocks and lower crustal rocks and are most abundant in the northern and eastern rim. Because these are samples of portions of the Earth that are inaccessible by mining or drilling, they are of great scientific interest.

Most of the mantle xenoliths at Kilbourne Hole are composed of lherzolite, a rock composed mostly of olivine and pyroxene. The olivine has a distinctive pale green color in which the pyroxene forms black flecks. Wehrlite is occasionally found here as well.

Deep crustal rocks include a variety of granulites of both high-silica (felsic) and low-silica (mafic) compositions. These likely took less than three days to reach the surface from their place of origin, and show pristine composition and texture. Their characteristics show that they were little altered from their formation 1.6 to 1.8 billion years ago, other than some reheating during the opening of the Rio Grande rift.

Xenoliths are almost entirely absent in the ejecta from Hunt's Hole, but xenoliths are found in Potrillo maar to the south.

NASA training
NASA geologically trained the Apollo Astronauts in April and Nov. 1969, June 1970, and Jan. and Dec. 1971.   Astronauts who would use this training on the Moon included Apollo 12's Pete Conrad and Alan Bean, Apollo 14's Alan Shepard and Edgar Mitchell, Apollo 15's David Scott and James Irwin, Apollo 16's John Young and Charlie Duke, and Apollo 17's Gene Cernan and Jack Schmitt.

Access
Kilbourne Hole is located within Organ Mountains–Desert Peaks National Monument and administered by the Bureau of Land Management.  It is accessed via Doña Ana County Road A-011, driving 8 miles west from the railroad.  The hole is "on the right, past the big tan dirt bank."  Much of the land inside the hole is private property.  Hunt's Hole is about 2 miles south on A-013.

See also 

 List of National Natural Landmarks in New Mexico

References

Maars of New Mexico
Organ Mountains–Desert Peaks National Monument
Landforms of Doña Ana County, New Mexico
National Natural Landmarks in New Mexico